5′-3′ exoribonuclease 1 (Xrn1) is a protein that in humans is encoded by the XRN1 gene. Xrn1 hydrolyses RNA in the 5′ to 3′ direction.

Function 

This gene encodes a member of the 5′-3′ exonuclease family. The encoded protein may be involved in replication-dependent histone mRNA degradation, and interacts directly with the enhancer of mRNA-decapping protein 4. In addition to mRNA metabolism, a similar protein in yeast has been implicated in a variety of nuclear and cytoplasmic functions, including transcription, translation, homologous recombination, meiosis, telomere maintenance, and microtubule assembly. Mutations in this gene are associated with osteosarcoma, suggesting that the encoded protein may also play a role in bone formation. Alternative splicing results in multiple transcript variants.

See also
 Xrn2

References

Further reading